Bainbridge Lake is a lake located south east of Port Alberni, British Columbia, named in 1895 for William Herbert Bainbridge. The City of Port Alberni obtains water from Bainbridge Lake.

References

Alberni Valley
Lakes of Vancouver Island
Alberni Land District